Paduka Sri Sultan Mahmud Syah II ibni al-Marhum Sultan Ibrahim Syah (1675 or 1680 – 1699) was the Sultan of Johor, Pahang and Lingga (1685 – 3 September 1699). As he was young upon assumption of the throne, regents oversaw the affairs of state in Johor until the death of the Bendahara, a high official, in 1697. Upon assuming duties as sultan, Mahmud Syah II undermined stability in the state due to his erratic behavior. As a result, he was murdered by members of his advisory council in 1699. The death of the Johor sultan led to a period of upheaval and chaos in the southern Melaka Straits, as successors jockeyed for control of the state.

Life 
The birth year of Mahmud Syah II is uncertain. Many sources report that he was born in 1675, while other state that it more likely closer to 1680. Much of this is obscured due to the circumstances of his rule and death. Mahmud Syah II became sultan in 1685, following the death of his father Ibrahim Syah, who had overseen an expansion of territorial control and economic prosperity of the state of Johor until it encompassed much of the southern reaches of the Melaka Straits and the Malay Peninsula as well as eastern Sumatra. As Mahmud Syah was a young child at the time, the state operated under the joint regency of his mother and the Bendahara Paduka Raja until the death of the latter (27 July 1697). Mahmud Syah II then took on all official duties as sultan.

The reign of Sultan Mahmud Syah II was disastrous. He was erratic and – according to contemporary European trade company sources as well as local texts – exhibited a "cruel nature" leading the state to be described as "ungovernable." Much of this was exhibited in sadistic behavior. Local texts contain references to the sultan being violent towards women, even ordering their execution for minor offences. The Scottish country trader Alexander Hamilton vividly recorded several incidents, including the discharge of a firearm into a servant to test its efficacy, which further supports these larger accounts. This behavior threatened the well-being of the state, as traders and merchants began avoiding the main port. The economic turmoil that ensued, combined with violence directed towards women related to the Orang kaya (Malay nobility), led high officials of the state to decide to act collectively against the sultan.

Death 
By August 1699 the Orang kaya enacted a plan to eliminate Sultan Mahmud. According to both European and local texts, the various officials of state descended upon the young sultan and stabbed him to death en masse. Many later accounts claim this occurred when Mahmud Syah II was making his way to the royal mosque, while others described it as occurring in the market. According to VOC (Dutch United East India Company) reports, the naked corpse was dragged to the Bendahara's residence, where it lay exposed until late afternoon. Later that night the body of Sultan Mahmud Syah II was wrapped in cloth, taken away and buried with little ceremony. His grave still exists in a village near Kota Tinggi in Johor, which is still known today as Kampung Makam (Village of the Tomb).

Aftermath of his murder 
The regicide of Sultan Mahmud Syah II created a crisis in the Johor state as he was considered to be the last in line of a dynasty of the Sultanate of Johor (founded by his grandfather, Sultan Alauddin Ri'ayat Shah II) descended from the line of rulers of Johor-Melaka-Srivijaya. After the murder, the Bendahara (chief minister) Abdul Jalil declared himself the next Sultan of Johor. Over the next two decades, the Bendahara dynasty had difficulty gaining support, leading to attempts from communities living in peripheral areas under Johor control to exert their own sovereignty. By 1718, a usurper from eastern Sumatra known as Raja Kecil, and claiming to be the son of Sultan Mahmud Syah II, attacked Johor with the support of Orang Laut and a variety of diverse ethnic groups. Following four years of chaotic rule, Raja Kecil retreated to eastern Sumatra, where he founded the Siak Sultanate in 1722, and descendants of the Bendahara sultan returned to power under a new arrangement with Bugis mercenaries, thus laying the foundation for the Johor-Riau-Lingga sultanate.

Legend and historiography 
As he was the last ruler of dynasty descended from the Sultans of Melaka (Malacca), and regicide was an unimaginable act in Malay culture, the murder of Sultan Mahmud Syah II created numerous difficulties for society at the time. Legends, tales, and alternative accounts quickly sprang up, mainly to reduce the complicity of the ruling elite in his death. Among the most popularly accepted retellings of these events placed blame for the regicide on one official, Laksamana Megat Sri Rama (hailing from Bintan), who was supposedly motivated by the disembowelment of his own pregnant wife under the orders of Mahmud Syah II. Enraged by this injustice, Megat Sri Rama attacked the sultan while he was being carried to Friday prayers, resulting in the common appellation "Sultan Mahmud Mangkat Dijulang," in remembrance of the way he was killed (mangkat being the Malay word referring specifically to a royal death) while being carried (dijulang) in a royal litter or dais. This tale was recreated in court texts for the next two centuries, particularly in the Tuhfat al-Nafis and the Hikayat Siak.

As Sultan Mahmud Syah II was childless at the time of his death, other legends arose related to Raja Kecil, who claimed that he was conceived in a supernatural manner on the eve of the murder. Although Raja Kecil already had adult children at the time of his attack upon the Johor state in 1718, his use of this legend in eastern Sumatra enabled him to attract followers hoping to continue the legacy of traditional Johor rulers and revenge the murder of a spiritually powerful ruler. The supposed connection between Raja Kecil and Sultan Mahmud Syah II was subsequently used to legitimatize the Siak Sultanate, which Raja Kecil founded in 1722, as a Malay state.

The legend of Sultan Mahmud Syah II become the subject matter for popular culture texts in the 1950s and 1960s, including the 1961 film Sultan Mahmud Mangkat Dijulang directed by K.M. Basker starring M. Amin as the sultan.

References

Sultans of Johor
1675 births
1699 deaths
17th-century Sultans of Pahang
Child monarchs from Asia
17th-century murdered monarchs
17th-century monarchs in Asia